Lori Jean Robinson (born  1959) is a retired United States Air Force general who served as commander of the United States Northern Command (USNORTHCOM) and commander of the North American Aerospace Defense Command (NORAD) from May 2016 to May 2018. She was the first female officer in the history of the United States Armed Forces to command a major Unified Combatant Command.

Robinson previously served as commander of Pacific Air Forces; air component commander for United States Pacific Command; and executive director, Pacific Air Combat Operations Staff, Joint Base Pearl Harbor–Hickam, Hawaii. The Pacific Air Forces command has responsibility for Air Force activities spread over half the globe and supports 45,000 airmen serving principally in Japan, South Korea, Hawaii, Alaska, and Guam.

On March 18, 2016, United States Secretary of Defense Ash Carter announced that Robinson would be named by President Barack Obama to replace Admiral William E. Gortney as commander of USNORTHCOM and NORAD, subject to approval by the United States Senate. In 2016 Robinson was named to Time magazine's list of 100 most influential people. Robinson was confirmed and took over from Admiral Gortney on 13 May 2016.

Military career

Robinson entered the United States Air Force in 1982 through the Reserve Officers' Training Corps program at the University of New Hampshire. She served in a variety of positions as an Air Battle Manager, including instructor and commander of the Command and Control Operations Division at the United States Air Force Weapons School, as well as Chief of Tactics in the 965th Airborne Warning and Control Squadron. She held staff assignments as command briefer at Headquarters Pacific Air Forces, deputy chief of staff and executive assistant to the director at the Defense Information Systems Agency, and executive officer to the commander of Air Combat Command.

Robinson commanded an operations group, a training wing, and an air control wing. She also deployed as vice commander of the 405th Air Expeditionary Wing, leading more than 2,000 airmen flying B-1 Lancer, KC-135 Stratotanker and E-3 Sentry aircraft in operations Enduring Freedom and Iraqi Freedom. Robinson was an Air Force Fellow at The Brookings Institution in Washington, D.C., and has served at the Pentagon as director of the Secretary of the Air Force and chief of staff of the Air Force Executive Action Group. She was also deputy director for force application and support, Directorate of Force Structure, Resources and Assessment, Joint Staff, the Pentagon, Washington, D.C. Following this, Robinson was director, Legislative Liaison, Office of the Secretary of the Air Force, the Pentagon, Washington, D.C., and the vice commander, Air Combat Command, Langley Air Force Base, Virginia.

On September 21, 2007, Robinson made history when she became the first air battle manager and first woman 552nd ACW commander to be frocked to brigadier general while stationed at Tinker Air Force Base, Oklahoma.

In 2014 Robinson was chosen to be commander of the Pacific Air Forces in Hawaii, making her the first United States female four-star commander of combat forces.  On May 13, 2016, she became the commanding general of United States Northern Command and was the first woman to command a unified combatant command.  On May 24, 2018, General Robinson transferred command of NORAD and NORTHCOM to General Terrence J. O'Shaughnessy. Robinson retired from the Air Force on June 7, 2018.

Personal life
Robinson is married to retired Air Force Major General David A. Robinson.

Robinson's stepdaughter, United States Air Force Reserve Second Lieutenant Taryn Ashley Robinson (b. February 1, 1983), was critically injured, and her civilian flight instructor James Weaver was killed, when their plane impacted terrain on September 21, 2005. Lieutenant Robinson later succumbed to her injuries and died on January 10, 2006. Lieutenant Robinson was an Air Force Academy graduate (Class of 2005), as was Weaver (Class of 1963).

Education

1981 Bachelor of Arts in English, University of New Hampshire, Durham, New Hampshire
1986 Squadron Officer School, Maxwell AFB, Alabama
1986 United States Air Force Fighter Weapons School, distinguished graduate, Nellis AFB, Nevada
1992 Master of Arts in education leadership and management, Troy State University, Troy, Alabama
1995 Master's degree in national security and strategic studies, College of Naval Command and Staff, Naval War College, Newport, R.I.
2001 Air War College, by correspondence
2002 Air Force Fellow, The Brookings Institution, Washington, D.C.
2005 Senior Executive Fellows Program, Harvard University, Cambridge, Massachusetts

Assignments
 January 1982 – June 1982, student, Basic Air Weapons Controller School, Tyndall AFB, Fla.
 June 1982 – January 1983, air weapons controller, Homestead AFB, Fla.
 January 1983 – January 1985, instructor air weapons controller and live-fire senior director, 81st Range Control Squadron, Tyndall AFB, Fla.
 January 1985 – February 1986, Chief of Training; and Chief of Standards and Evaluations, 848th Air Control and Weapons Squadron, Wallace Air Station, the Philippines
 February 1986 – September 1986, air weapons controller, Air Weapons Controller Division, USAF Fighter Weapons School, Nellis AFB, Nev.
 September 1986 – December 1986, student, USAF Fighter Weapons School, Nellis AFB, Nev.
 December 1986 – October 1989, instructor and course manager, Air Weapon Control Division, USAF Fighter Weapons School, Nellis AFB, Nev.
 October 1989  – August 1992, Chief of Current Operations and command briefer, Headquarters Pacific Air Forces, Hickam AFB, Hawaii
 August 1992 – May 1993, air weapons controller, 552nd Air Control Wing, Tinker AFB, Okla.
 June 1993 – June 1994, Chief, Weapons and Tactics Branch, 965th Airborne Warning and Control Squadron, Tinker AFB, Okla.
 July 1994 – June 1995, student, College of Naval Command and Staff, Naval War College, Newport, R.I.
 June 1995 – September 1995, student, Armed Forces Staff College, Norfolk, Va.
 September 1995 – December 1997, command, control and communication officer, deputy chief of staff, and executive assistant to the director, Defense Information Systems Agency, Arlington, Va.
 December 1997 – June 1998, student, mission crew commander training, Nellis AFB, Nev.
 June 1998 – February 2000, commander, Command and Control Operations Division, USAF Weapons School, Nellis AFB, Nev.
 February 2000 – July 2001, executive officer to the commander, Air Combat Command, Langley AFB, Va.
 July 2001 – June 2002, Air Force Fellow, The Brookings Institution, Washington, D.C.
 June 2002 – August 2004, commander, 552nd Operations Group, Tinker AFB, Okla. (March 2003 – May 2003, vice commander, 405th Air Expeditionary Wing, Southwest Asia)
 August 2004 – August 2005, commander, 17th Training Wing, Goodfellow AFB, Texas
 August 2005 – September 2006, director, Secretary of the Air Force and chief of staff of the Air Force Executive Action Group, Washington, D.C.
 September 2006 – May 2007, Chief, Air Force House Liaison Office, Legislative Liaison, Office of the Secretary of the Air Force, Headquarters U.S. Air Force, Washington, D.C.
 May 2007 – August 2008, commander, 552nd Air Control Wing, Tinker AFB, Okla.
 September 2008 – October 2010, deputy director for Force Application and Support, Directorate of Force Structure, Resources and Assessment, Joint Staff, the Pentagon, Washington, D.C.
 October 2010 – June 2012, director, Legislative Liaison, Office of the Secretary of the Air Force, the Pentagon, Washington, D.C.
 June 2012 – April 2013, deputy commander, U.S. Air Forces Central Command; deputy, Combined Force Air Component Commander, U.S. Central Command, Southwest Asia.
 May 2013 – October 2014, vice commander, Air Combat Command, Langley AFB, Va
 October 2014 – May 2016, commander, Pacific Air Forces; Air Component Commander for U.S. Pacific Command; and executive director, Pacific Air Combat Operations Staff, Joint Base Pearl Harbor–Hickam, Hawaii
 May 2016 – May 2018, commander, USNORTHCOM; commander, NORAD

Flight experience
Rating: Senior Air Battle Manager
Flight hours: more than 900
Aircraft: E-3B/C and E-8C

Awards and decorations

Effective dates of promotion
  Second Lieutenant May 24, 1981
  First Lieutenant September 11, 1983
  Captain September 11, 1985
  Major January 1, 1994
  Lieutenant Colonel July 1, 1998
  Colonel August 1, 2002
  Brigadier General July 22, 2008
  Major General May, 2011
  Lieutenant General May 20, 2013
  General October 16, 2014

See also

 List of female United States military generals and flag officers
List of United States Air Force lieutenant generals from 2010 to 2019
Timeline of women in warfare and the military in the United States from 2011–present
List of American women's firsts

References

External links

 

1959 births
Living people
University of New Hampshire alumni
Military personnel from Texas
United States Air Force personnel of the Gulf War
Troy University alumni
College of Naval Command and Staff alumni
United States Air Force personnel of the War in Afghanistan (2001–2021)
Female generals of the United States Air Force
Recipients of the Air Force Distinguished Service Medal
Recipients of the Defense Distinguished Service Medal
Recipients of the Defense Superior Service Medal
Recipients of the Legion of Merit
20th-century American women
21st-century American women